The Larry Bird Missouri Valley Conference Men's Basketball Player of the Year is an annual basketball award given to the Missouri Valley Conference's most outstanding player. The award was first given following the 1968–69 season. It was renamed to honor Basketball Hall of Famer Larry Bird, who played at Indiana State from 1977 to 1979 and led the Sycamores to the 1979 NCAA Championship game.  Bird won every major player of the year award (including the Naismith and Wooden awards) in 1979.

Creighton had the most all-time winners with seven, but it left the conference in July 2013 to join the reconfigured Big East Conference. Among schools remaining in the conference beyond 2013, Bradley, Drake and Southern Illinois have the most winners, with six apiece. Four current conference members have not had a winner, but three of them (Belmont, Murray State, and UIC) are playing their first MVC seasons in 2022–23, and the other (Valparaiso) played its first MVC season in 2017–18.

There have never been any ties for the player of the year, but there have been nine repeat winners in the award's history. Of the repeat winners, Fred VanVleet of Wichita State (2014 and 2016) and A. J. Green of Northern Iowa (2020, 2022) won in non-consecutive years.

Key

Winners

Winners by school

Footnotes

References
 

NCAA Division I men's basketball conference players of the year
Player of the Year
Awards established in 1969